Developmental Psychology is a peer-reviewed academic journal published by the American Psychological Association covering research in developmental psychology. Publishing formats are research articles, reviews, and theoretical or methodological articles. The current editor-in-chief is Eric F. Dubow (Bowling Green State University and University of Michigan).

The journal has implemented the Transparency and Openness Promotion guidelines that provide structure to research planning and reporting and aim to make research more transparent, accessible, and reproducible.

History 
The journal was established in 1969, with Boyd R. McCandless (Emory University) as founding editor-in-chief.

Abstracting and indexing 
The journal is indexed by the following services: 
Academic Search
CAB Abstracts
Criminal Justice Abstracts
Current Contents/Social & Behavioral Sciences
Global Health
MEDLINE/PubMed
PsycINFO
Scopus
Social Sciences Citation Index
According to the Journal Citation Reports, the journal has a 2020 impact factor of 3.845.

References

External links 
 

Publications established in 1969
Bimonthly journals
American Psychological Association academic journals
English-language journals
Developmental psychology journals